Sacramento International Airport  is located  northwest of Downtown Sacramento in Sacramento County, California, United States and covers . It serves the Sacramento Metropolitan Area, and it is run by the Sacramento County Airport System. The airport is the main gateway to the California State Capitol.

The airport is also a gateway to some attractions and adventures in Northern and Central California such as Heavenly Mountain Resort, Lake Tahoe, Yosemite National Park, Old Sacramento State Historic Park history of gold rush, underground tunnels, floods, and fire, etc., Wine Country, Yolo Bypass Wildlife Area, Cosumnes River Preserve, Hawver Cave, and Sutter's Mill and Marshall Gold Discovery State Historic Park.

History 
Sacramento International Airport (SMF) opened on October 21, 1967, as Sacramento Metropolitan Airport (the airfield itself was Sacramento Metropolitan Field), with one 8600-foot runway. The initial runway was on the west side of the airfield and is now named to the headings of 17R/35L. Previously, air service to Sacramento was handled by Sacramento Municipal Airport (SAC), now known as Sacramento Executive Airport. Sacramento Metropolitan was the first purpose-built public-use airport west of the Mississippi when it opened in 1967. All airports under the Sacramento County Airport System (previously the Sacramento County Department of Airports), including SMF, are self-supporting through user fees and rentals. No local, state or federal tax funds are used for operating costs.

The airport initially had five airlines: Pacific Air Lines, Pacific Southwest Airlines (PSA), United Airlines, Western Airlines and West Coast Airlines.

1980s and 90s 
In the 1980s, SMF added: the in-flight catering facility (1980), an FAA Flight Inspection Field Office (1985), a second air cargo facility (1985) and the east runway (1987). The east runway's opening was celebrated by the landing of a Concorde SST. America West Airlines, Continental Airlines, Morris Air, Northwest Airlines and American Eagle Airlines joined the original carriers at Sacramento Metropolitan Airport during this time.

In 1998, the consolidated rental car facility and Terminal A (designed by Dreyfuss & Blackford Architects) opened. The consolidated rental car terminal was the first of its kind in the nation and gave all rental car customers a single point of access that could be reached on a single shuttle. This innovation streamlined bus operations to reduce congestion at the terminal and improve air quality while enhancing customer service.

With the opening of the new Terminal A, the airport was renamed Sacramento International Airport, though it did not receive international flights until 2002 when Mexicana started nonstops to Guadalajara. The airport was designated a port of entry on October 5, 2006.

The Sacramento County Airport System launched its website in April 1997.

Southwest Airlines (1991), Alaska Airlines (1993), Horizon Air (1993) and Trans World Airlines (TWA) (1994) were added to the list of carriers at Sacramento. Southwest and Alaska Airlines grew quickly, offsetting the departure of airlines such as American Eagle, Continental and USAir which had acquired PSA.

21st century: New challenges, opportunities and growth 
September 11 did not deter growth at Sacramento International Airport. Four airlines were soon added to Sacramento International: Continental returned (2000) and Frontier 
Airlines (2002), Mexicana Airlines (2002), Hawaiian Airlines (2002) and Aloha Airlines (2003) initiated service. Mexicana's arrival initiated international nonstop flights and necessitated the completion of the International Arrivals Building for federal inspection services.

The Terminal A Parking Garage opened on September 23, 2004. The six-story structure had covered parking, a short walk to the terminal and public art ("Flying Gardens" by Dennis Oppenheim) installed outside the garage, and "Flying Carpet" by Seyed Alavi, installed in the connecting walkway.

In 2006, Sacramento International Airport was one of the first airports in the nation to offer free wireless Internet service (WiFi).

Industry churn 
As the nation's economy was taking a hit in 2008, commercial aviation was challenged by reduced passenger numbers and increasing fuel and other costs. The airport was a focus city for ExpressJet which independently operated Embraer ERJ-145s on point-to-point, "hub bypass" routes. In 2008, ExpressJet ended all independent flying and refocused its business on codeshares for major airlines. Also in 2008, Aloha Airlines ceased operations and Mexicana discontinued operations as well. Air Canada flew to this airport in 2007–2008 to Vancouver, but ended the route in 2008; It was announced that the route would resume on May 17, 2018.

Prior to the downturn, new services began and several airlines merged. America West and US Airways merged, Northwest and Delta merged, and United and Continental initiated their merger by the end of 2011. Despite these challenges, Alaska added nonstop flights to Guadalajara, Mexico (now discontinued), and Hawaii (Maui) while Aeromexico's (2011) debut reestablished foreign-flag service with daily nonstops to Guadalajara, Mexico. The new Terminal B opened on October 6, 2011, the largest airport terminal in the United States to achieve LEED Silver status.

On June 5, 2008 US Airways began seasonal flights to Charlotte and Philadelphia. Sacramento was the origin for the last scheduled MD-80 flight on Alaska Airlines, Flight 363 from Sacramento to Seattle on August 24, 2008. In the summer of 2010, Delta Air Lines began seasonal flights to Detroit. Continental Airlines, which later merged with United Airlines, previously had seasonal flights to Newark. Sacramento's seasonal route operated during the summer and fall. On January 6, 2013, Frontier Airlines ended service to Denver. US Airways previously flew to Las Vegas, but ended service after closing its Las Vegas hub.

Long dominated by Southwest and United (United Express), the intra-California market was joined in 2011 by American (American Eagle Airlines, April 2011) and Delta (Delta Connection) which provide service to and from LAX. Frontier Airlines previously provided service between SMF and Redding.

Sacramento County tried (and failed) to entice Virgin America into adding a flight between SMF and Los Angeles by offering the airline $400,000 to operate out of terminal A or $150,000 to operate in terminal B; other airports were also trying to entice the airline.

In 2011, the airport carried an estimated 9 million passengers; it averaged 323 flights a day.

Recent developments 
On July 6, 2013, the airport was one of ten airports that hosted flights diverted from San Francisco International Airport after Asiana Airlines Flight 214 crashed short of the runway.

On December 17, 2013, Aeroméxico began seasonal service to Del Bajío International Airport.

On November 18, 2014, United Airlines announced it would suspend service to Washington D.C. from January 6, 2015, to April 6, 2015, citing seasonal demand. On May 4, 2015 Delta Air Lines started service to Seattle–Tacoma with the flights operated by SkyWest Airlines. On December 3, 2014, United Express ended service to Arcata/Eureka and Crescent City. On February 9, 2015, SeaPort Airlines began service to Visalia. On June 18, 2015, JetBlue Airways started seasonal service to Boston. On April 8, 2015, Southwest Airlines started service to Dallas–Love. They also announced (later in the year) service to Boise beginning January 6, 2016. On March 26, 2015, Aeroméxico started service to Mexico City. In the month of May, American Airlines added a fifth flight to Dallas Fort-Worth.

On April 23, 2015, the airport announced that it had posted twelve consecutive months of improved passenger traffic that started in April 2014, and 8.9 million passengers were served in 2014. Passenger growth continued in 2015 and 2016, with 9.6 million passengers served in 2015 and 10.1 million in 2016. In 2017, the airport surpassed its 2007 high of 10.7 million passengers, with 10.9 million passengers. Amongst the 35 largest metropolitan regions in the country, Sacramento has the fewest international flights.

In 2016, American Airlines announced that it would begin flying between Sacramento and Chicago O'Hare beginning in June with twice daily flights for the summer season and a single nonstop the rest of the year.

In 2017, Southwest added nonstop service to Long Beach and Spokane, Air Canada resumed its nonstop service to Vancouver, and United added nonstop service to Newark.

In 2018, Southwest added nonstop service to Austin, New Orleans, Orlando, San Jose del Cabo, and St. Louis.

By 2019, Southwest added much-awaited service to Honolulu and Kahului, exemplifying the evolution and growth of Sacramento International Airport as well as its burgeoning route network offerings, especially in the 2010s.

Solar power 
In January 2018, Sacramento International Airport's solar array was commissioned; it is rated at 7.9 MW and will supply around 30% of the airport's electricity needs. The electricity will be purchased by NRG Energy for an agreed period of 25 years. The project was built by Borrego Solar using LG solar panels at a cost of $15 million. The solar power costs 7 cents per kWh as opposed to 9 cents, so the airport expects to save nearly $1 million annually.

Facilities 

 17L/35R: , concrete
 17R/35L: , concrete

The runways were redesignated 17/35 from 16/34 on May 20, 2020.

The west runway, 17R/35L, was closed from April 2019 to October 23, 2019, for a renovation which replaced the asphalt with concrete.

When winds are from the south (about 70% of the year), the airfield operates in "South Flow", with arrivals and departures on runways 17R and 17L. Arrivals from the south fly past the west side of the airport before turning 180 degrees and landing on 17L or 17R. This is done so that arriving aircraft clear departing aircraft, which generally turn southeast after departing.

During the other 30% of the year (typically between the fall and spring), the airfield operates in "North Flow", with arrivals and departures on runways 35L and 35R. As in South Flow, departing aircraft generally turn east to southeast immediately after taking off, so arrivals from the north pass west of the airport before turning north to land. Residences near SMF are typically south and east of the airport, so North Flow is preferred at night (between 2145 and 0745 local time), conditions permitting, to route flights over agricultural land.

Terminals 

The airport has two terminals, Terminal A, with 13 gates; and Terminal B, with 19 gates; totaling 32 gates. The old Terminal B had 14 gates. 8 airlines operate out of Terminal B and 4 airlines operate out of Terminal A. All indoor public areas have free wi-fi (wireless Internet) provided by the Sacramento County Airport System.

Dreyfuss + Blackford Architecture has been the Architect of Record for SMF since its inception. The original Terminal B (1967) and Terminal A (1998) were designed by Dreyfuss + Blackford, and they served as the local architect for the new Central Terminal B (landside building, 2011) with Corgan Associates and Fentress Architects.

A Hyatt Place hotel is planned to be built between the two current terminals. Previously, the onsite Host Hotel was demolished in 2008 during Terminal B construction. An in-terminal hotel was proposed for Terminal B, but plans were temporarily dropped during the economic downturn of 2008, although subsequent economic regeneration and aviation growth have since revitalized such plans.

Sacramento County Airport System has rolled out an advertising campaign dubbed "Easy as SMF" to tout the convenience of flying through SMF for residents on the eastern edge of the San Francisco Bay Area. Due to the Terminal B rebuild, until recently SMF charged some of the highest fees for airlines, which discouraged some carriers from operating through SMF, although SMF has since regained its reputation as a relatively budget-friendly airport, with extensive service by low-cost carriers, such as Frontier and Spirit Airlines. The Oakland and San Francisco airports attract Sacramento-area residents seeking lower fares and more destinations.

Terminal A 

Air Canada, American, Delta, and United operate out of the thirteen gates in Terminal A.

The food court in Terminal A was remodeled in 2014–15 in an effort to bring a similar customer experience with unique-to-Sacramento restaurants as provided in Terminal B. Also, the airport re-added another gate back into its Terminal A and opened on March 18, 2021, the new gate A13 to a total back to 13 gates. Future expansion at Terminal A may include conversion to an airside concourse and the addition of a second automated people mover.

Terminal B 
Aeromexico, Alaska, Frontier, Hawaiian, JetBlue, Southwest, Spirit, and Volaris are located in the nineteen gates in Terminal B.

The old Terminal B was built in 1967 as the main terminal building for the new Sacramento Metropolitan Airport with 14 gates before being demolished in 2012. The newer and bigger rebuild Terminal B was completed and opened in 2011 with 19 gates, but the original plan was supposed to be 22 gates in total due to the high costs. Dreyfuss + Blackford, the original architects, also designed a renovation and expansion completed in 1999. By that time, Terminal A was complete and frequent travelers described the 1967 Terminal B as "often overcrowded with waiting travelers."

Expansion project 

On June 7, 2006, plans were announced to replace Terminal B with a brand new terminal by the year 2012. In 2008, the Sacramento County Airport System broke ground on the largest capital improvement project in the history of the County of Sacramento: "The Big Build." The expanded Terminal B was designed by Corgan Associates, Inc. in association with Fentress Architects. The landside (pre-security) portion of Terminal B was built by the joint venture of Austin Commercial, LP and Walsh Construction, and the glass and aluminum facade was constructed by AGA (Architectural Glass and Aluminum). The airside gates and people mover were built by Turner Construction. The $1.03 billion terminal modernization project replaced the airport's original, aging Terminal B to meet the rising demand for passenger services and improved the airport's ability to attract new carriers and routes.

The Central Terminal B complex is three times the size of the original Terminal B with the two parts of the complex – airside and landside – connected by the SMF Automated People Mover. The capacity of Terminal B is 16 million passengers per year, which is not expected to be reached until late in the 2020s. Approximately half of the $1 billion cost of the new terminal comes from a new ticket surcharge of $4.50 per passenger and parking fees.

Airport officials held a press conference on July 15, 2011, at the California State Fair, announcing the terminal would open on October 6, 2011. This was many months ahead of schedule compared to the original projected opening in 2012.

The new Central Terminal B became fully operational on October 6, 2011. Salvage and deconstruction of the International Arrivals Building and demolition of the original Terminal B was completed November 2012. Travel + Leisure named Terminal B one of the "Coolest New Airport Terminals" in 2012.

The airport's first waiter-serviced restaurants were introduced to the new Terminal B when it opened. These two restaurants are Esquire Grill by famous restaurateur Randy Paragary, a trendy and upscale option, and Cafeteria 15L, a low-cost and budget-inspired restaurant with fast food. Other Sacramento favorites held concession stands in the terminal, creating an entirely new Farm To Fork vibe in the airport which Northern California is so renowned for.

In total, 14 artists were commissioned at a sum cost of $6 million to create artworks for the new Terminal B, including the mixed media wood-and-crystal sculpture "Acorn Steam" by Donald Lipski (named as an anagram of "Sacramento"), the interactive "Your Words are Music to My Ears" by the collaboration Living Lenses, consisting of artists Po Shu Wang and Louise Bertelsen, a large wooden sculpture portrait entitled "The Baggage Handlers" by Christian Moeller, and a painted steel-and-glass house entitled "The House Will Not Pass for Any Color but Its Own" by Mildred Howard.

SMForward and potential new terminal 

On February 1, 2023, the airport announced a $1.3 Billion dollar expansion that would surpass the Big Build project as the largest expansion in the airport's history. Called SMForward, this expansion covers the first 5 years of expansion that will ultimately lead to the completion of the 20 year Master Plan envisioned in 2020. Over the next five years, the airport plans to build complete the following: 

 A new $140 Million pedestrian walkway that will be adjacent to the Automated People Mover (APM) that can be used as an alternative to the APM and can connect passengers to a potential Terminal C. This project is expected to start in the summer of 2024 and complete in the winter of 2025. 
 A concourse expansion that will add six to eight gates on the western side of Terminal B. Construction is expected to begin in 2024 and be completed in 2027. 
 An expansion of the Terminal A lobby to add a new baggage claim carousel and additional ticketing space. Construction is expected to begin in the winter of 2024 and be complete in the spring of 2027. 
 A new 4,500-5,500 space parking garage that will replace a parking lot adjacent to Terminal B. Construction is expected to start in 2024 and be complete by spring 2026.
 A $55 Million consolidated transportation ground transportation center that will allow ride-share services, taxis, and shuttles to serve both Terminals. Construction is expected to start in the spring of 2024 and be complete by the summer of 2026.
 A $390 Million rental car facility south of the parking garage adjacent to Terminal A. This will allow passengers to walk from either Terminal to access the rental car service. Construction expects to start in the fall of 2025 and be complete by the summer of 2027. 

The current version of the 2020 Master Plan calls for SMF to expand and add up to 18 more new gates to existing Terminals A and B, including the proposed six to eight gates proposed with SMForward, or to construct a new Terminal C that would contain 12 gates. At buildout, SMF is expected to have 50 gates over two or three Terminals. Future expansion plans include an extension of the Green Line to the airport, connecting passengers to Downtown Sacramento and a long-standing proposal to extend one of the airport's runways to 11,000 feet (3,400 meters) to support long-haul international flights, as well as the relocation of certain key taxiways.

Airlines and destinations

Passenger

Cargo

Statistics

Top destinations

Airline market share

Annual traffic

Ground transportation

Road 
The airport is accessed via Airport Blvd directly from Interstate 5 at exit 528. The following can be reached via I-5 within 10 miles of the airport: Interstate 80, CA-113, U.S. Route 50 and CA-99.

Public transit 
Yolobus bus No. 42A connects the airport to Sacramento, Woodland and Davis. Sacramento Regional Transit bus Express No. 142 and Yolobus bus No. 42B connect directly from downtown Sacramento to SMF.

Rail
Sacramento Regional Transit will provide a future light rail link, an extension of the Green Line, to the airport. Environmental evaluation, clearance and construction for the Green Line was projected to be complete by 2018, but the project was never completed and had been delayed for the past few years.

Both Altamont Corridor Express and Amtrak California San Joaquin services are expected to terminate at a nearby planned Natomas/Airport station where bus bridges will complete the journey to the airport.

Taxicab 
Nowadays Sacramento Taxi Yellow Cab offers taxi booking from Sacramento International Airport. Just like limos and shuttles.

Accidents and incidents 
 On the afternoon of Thursday, August 26, 2010, JetBlue Flight 262, an Airbus 320 arriving from Long Beach blew four tires upon landing, creating a fire around the plane and causing passengers to evacuate. Out of the 84 passengers and crew, seven sustained injuries, though none were serious. Five passengers were hospitalized. A JetBlue spokesman said that the flight reported an issue with the brakes. The subsequent alert via Electronic Centralized Aircraft Monitoring was also canceled by the first officer as part of his routine to preempt the alert associated with disconnecting the autopilot in preparation for landing.
 At about 6:30 PM on Tuesday, December 27, 2011, Seattle-bound Southwest Airlines Flight 2287 aborted take-off due to two blown-out tires. The plane reportedly made a hard landing; all 130 passengers aboard survived.
 Shortly before 6:00 PM on Wednesday, October 15, 2014, a pilot on an in-bound FedEx Express McDonnell Douglas MD-10-30 noticed a possible engine fire on one of the engines, with smoke showing. The aircraft declared an emergency and landed successfully. Emergency ground crews reported to the incident and determined that the on-board extinguishers had successfully extinguished the fire. Maintenance crews determined the aircraft could safely be towed to the cargo ramp for inspection and repairs.
 On Wednesday, November 25, 2015, around 5:45 pm, United Airlines Flight 2005 from SMF to Denver, an Airbus A320 with 114 people on board, was forced to turn around after an engine was damaged by a bird strike. About 10 minutes into the flight, the bird strike and subsequent explosion in the engine forced the plane to return to the airport. It landed at about 6:30 p.m., with no injuries reported. The airliner was taken out of service to make repairs to the engine.
 On Tuesday, June 7, 2022, at 1:31 PM, A Fedex McDonnell Douglas MD-10, registration N306FE performing flight FedEx 463 from Sacramento, California, to Memphis, Tennessee, with 3 crew, was enroute at 31,000 feet about 40 nm northwest of Tulsa, Oklahoma, when the crew decided to divert to Tulsa due to a fire indication in the cargo bay. On approach, the crew reported they now got an additional cargo fire alert in the aft cargo area. The crew requested runway 18L and landed safely about 18 minutes after leaving FL310. The tower reported seeing no smoke from the aircraft. Emergency services reported a heat signature prompting the crew to evacuate the aircraft. Both runways at Tulsa were closed for about 30 minutes while emergency services put the fire out.
 On Tuesday, Jan 10, 2023, at about 6pm, Southwest Airlines flight 1096 from Sacramento to Burbank experience a bird strike on the left engine just a few minutes after takeoff. The crew declared an emergency and diverted back to Sacramento. On the ground, an Alert 2 was declared and emergency vehicles were deployed. After dumping fuel, the aircraft made an uneventful landing back on runway 17L. The flight was carrying passengers, including the UC Davis men's basketball team.

Gallery

See also 

Transportation in the Sacramento metropolitan area

References

External links 

Sacramento International Airport (official site)

Airports in Sacramento County, California
Airports established in 1967
Transportation in Sacramento, California
1967 establishments in California